Silverio García Lara is a researcher and head of AgroBio Unit and a professor of Nutri-Omics Group with the Monterrey Institute of Technology and Higher Studies, Campus Monterrey within the National School of Science. 
Silverio García-Lara obtained his PhD in Experimental Biology from the Autonomous Metropolitan University during which he develop a PhD stay the University of Ottawa in Canada and subsequently Postdoctoral studies at the International Center for Maize and Wheat Improvement, CIMMYT, Int.

From 2006 to 2008 he was the head of Entomology Unit at the Global Maize Program of CIMMYT and in 2009 he was invited as a visiting scientist at Global ICARDA-CIMMYT-IITA Maize Program. He is currently an Associate Professor and Senior Scientist at the National School of Science and Technology at Tecnologico de Monterrey.  Among its main achievements he had developed, improved and characterized storage pests resistant corn and corn with nutraceutical properties. He has developed several comprehensive technologies of global food security to reduce post-harvest problems for Latin America, Africa and Asia. García Lara has worked on ways reduced the amount of food loss in storage, especially corn, coffee and rice. He and two students have also discovered anti-cancer properties in Mexican oregano and corn . He has received financial support from agencies and foundations such as FEMSA, CONACYT, SAGARPA, USDA-USA, CIDA-CANADA, CIMMYT MasAgro, GrainPro, Monsanto, and Kelloggs, among others.

His work in molecular breeding, postharvest biotechnology and nutraceutical bio-characterization has been recognized and awarded by the Canadian Foundation for the International Conference on Agricultural Biotechnology (ABIC), The Consultative Group on International Agriculture (CGIAR), AGROBIO Mexico and the Institute of Nutrition of BIMBO Group. He was recognized at the second Convención Latinoamericana hermetic Storage in Guatemala for the testing of special plastic bags for grain storage.  In 2012 he got the Teaching and Research Award by Tecnologico de Monterrey. He is a regular member of the Mexican Academy of Science since 2014.Mexico's Sistema Nacional de Investigadores has recognized his work with Level 3 membership.

García Lara has more than 200 abstracts presented at national and international conferences and currently has more than 100 publications, ten book chapters, three books, four patents, and dozens of outreach lectures at various national and international forums.

See also
List of Monterrey Institute of Technology and Higher Education faculty

References

Living people
Academic staff of the Monterrey Institute of Technology and Higher Education
Year of birth missing (living people)